Skay or SKAY may refer to:
 SKAY, Ukrainian pop-rock band
 Skay Beilinson (born 1952), Argentine guitarist
 Brigitte Skay (1940–2012), German actress

See also 
 Skai (disambiguation)
 Sky (disambiguation)
 Skey